Female brain can refer to
The female brain. See sexual differentiation.
The 2006 book The Female Brain (book) by Louann Brizendine, M.D. about the subject.